Robat-e Malek (also Romanized as Robāţ-e Malek; also known as Robāţ-e Malakī, Robāţ-e Malekī, and Robat Maleki) is a village in Jolgeh Rural District, in the Central District of Golpayegan County, Isfahan Province, Iran. At the 2006 census, its population was 352, in 112 families.

See also
Robat (disambiguation)

References

Populated places in Golpayegan County